Lyudmila Borsuk (born 28 April 1952) is a Belarusian athlete. She competed in the women's long jump at the 1976 Summer Olympics, representing the Soviet Union.

References

External links
 

1952 births
Living people
Athletes (track and field) at the 1976 Summer Olympics
Belarusian female long jumpers
Soviet female long jumpers
Olympic athletes of the Soviet Union
Sportspeople from Brest, Belarus